Crawford is an unincorporated community in Nassau County, Florida, United States. It is located on US 301 in the southwestern part of the county. The community also includes a railroad junction with the CSX Callahan Subdivision and the Norfolk Southern Railway Valdosta District.

Crawford is also the home of the Thomas Creek Tract of the Cary State Forest.

References

Unincorporated communities in Nassau County, Florida
Unincorporated communities in the Jacksonville metropolitan area
Unincorporated communities in Florida